Brugnera is a comune (municipality) in the Province of Pordenone in the Italian region Friuli-Venezia Giulia, located about  northwest of Trieste and about  southwest of Pordenone, with about 9,000 inhabitants.

The municipality of Brugnera contains the frazioni (subdivisions, mainly villages and hamlets) Maron, Tamai and San Cassiano di Livenza.

Brugnera borders the following municipalities: Fontanafredda, Gaiarine, Porcia, Portobuffolé, Prata di Pordenone, Sacile.

References

External links
Official website 

Cities and towns in Friuli-Venezia Giulia